Bmaryam, also spelled Bmariam, is a village in Baabda District, Mount Lebanon Governorate, Lebanon.

History 

During the Mountain War many of the Christians in the village fled due to fighting. On 1 September 1983, Druze militias entered the Syrian-controlled village and killed 39 of Christian civilians. The right-wing Phalangist-operated Voice of Lebanon radio station reported that the militias had "butchered about 40 elderly persons and children with knives, including the town’s priest, Gergis El-Rai," and that only one remaining Christian had survived.

References 

Populated places in Baabda District
Massacres of the Lebanese Civil War
Massacres in 1983
Massacres of Christians in Lebanon
1983 murders in Lebanon
Mountain War (Lebanon)